Queen Seondeok is a 2009 South Korean historical drama produced by MBC and Time Box Production for the former's 48th founding anniversary, starring Lee Yo-won, Go Hyun-jung, Uhm Tae-woong, Kim Nam-gil, and Park Ye-jin. It chronicles the life of Queen Seondeok of Silla. It aired on MBC from 25 May to 22 December 2009 on Mondays and Tuesdays at 21:55 for 62 episodes.

The viewership ratings for the show topped TV charts almost every week during its run, peaking at 43.6 percent. It swept the 2009 MBC Drama Awards; actress Go Hyun-jung's performance and subsequent grand prize win received near-universal acclaim.

Synopsis
The series begins at the end of King Jinheung's reign and continues until the end of Queen Seondeok's reign. Deokman was born as one of the twin daughters of King Jinpyeong and Queen Maya, but due to a prophecy, King Jinpyeong had to send his daughter away from the palace with the help of his clumsy but loyal servant Seohwa, in order to save Queen Maya from being ousted by Mishil, whose ambition was to become Queen. Seohwa raised Deokman as if she were her own, but a turn of events eventually led Deokman into finding out her real identity - only to be abandoned once again by her family in order to save the throne from Mishil's hand, with the exception of her twin sister Cheonmyeon, who ended up losing her life while trying to help Deokman escape. Out of hatred, Deokman set out to take back what was taken from her and avenge her sister by bringing Mishil down and becoming the first female king of Silla with the help of her trusted friend, Yushin, and troubled rogue Bidam who she loved, and ultimately led a rebellion near the end of her reign because of a misunderstanding.

Cast

Main
Lee Yo-won as Princess Deokman, later Queen Seondeok 
Nam Ji-hyun as young Deokman
A charismatic, yet solitary ruler: She was known as the first female ruler in Korean history. Deokman was born as the twin sister of Princess Cheonmyong and had a close brush with death as a baby due to the attempted assassination by Mi-shil, who had ambitions for the throne. A loyal servant named So-hwa rescued her by fleeing the kingdom with her. She loves to be around people, but after becoming a queen, she lost the liberty to trust them as sincerely and innocently as she once did. As ruling queen, she is deeply lonely and filled with despair. Yet she must hide her true feelings and stand on her own to be reborn as a true king.

Go Hyun-jung as Lady Mishil 
Uee as young Mishil
Archenemy of Queen Seondeok: A Royal concubine who will stop at nothing in order to achieve her dream of becoming a Queen. She rose to power as a result of her relationships with prominent rulers and officials. She was concubine to three successive Silla kings: King Jinheung, King Jinji, and King Jinpyeong. She was the wife of Lord Sejong (the prime minister), the lover of General Seolwon and the mother of Bidam.

Park Ye-jin as Princess Cheonmyeong 
Shin Se-kyung as young Cheonmyeong
Kim Yoo-jung as 10-year-old Cheonmyeong
Princess Cheonmyeong was Princess Deokman's twin sister, as the firstborn daughter, King Jinpyeong choose her to stay in the palace in the belief that she was the destined child who will bring Mishil down someday. She grew up fearing Mishil which led to her living a life out of politics. She fell in love and married King Jinji's son Kim Yongsu but one day, Kim Yongsu was nominated as a possible candidate for the throne but had to prove himself worthy of it which in the end caused him his death. Believing that Mishil had her hand on his death, she set out gathering allies in order to bring Mishil down one day. She was the first person to find out about Deokman's real identity and did everything she can in order to help her sister which costs her life.

Uhm Tae-woong as Kim Yushin
Lee Hyun-woo as young Kim Yushin
The invincible warrior forever remembered by history: With a grand vision of unifying the three kingdoms under Silla's rule, he aligns himself with Princess Deokman who puts her complete trust on him. He became an invincible warrior, admired by all in the capital. He earns a well-deserved place in history, the very thing that Bidam desires.

Kim Nam-gil as Bidam 
Park Ji-bin as young Bidam
The glorious downfall of a tragic hero: Bidam inherits the life of Mishil, and their story comes to an end. The tragedy of his mother's life comes full circle and he becomes the wretched hero of the same fate. Ultimately he gains nothing he desires - not a place in history, Silla nor Deokman - and ends up forgotten by history, recorded only as the instigator of a mutiny. He is loved then hated, he gains power only to lose it, he earns the trust of people and then loses that trust. He will crash and burn, and his end will be tragic and glorious.

Supporting

Yoo Seung-ho as Kim Chunchu (later King Taejong Muyeol)
Jung Yoon-seok as young Kim Chunchu
Ruler of the next age and ruler of the Three Kingdoms:  This series began with Misil's age, continues through Deokman's age and will end at the start of Chunchu's age. This precocious genius will find his own footing alongside Deokman, Yusin, and Bidam, and gain power in his own way. Ultimately he will be the one to uphold the dream that began with the late King Jijeung and unify the Three Kingdoms.

Lee Seung-hyo as Kim Alcheon 
Ho Hyo-hoon as young Kim Alcheon
He is most well known as Deokman's staunch supporter and bodyguard. He was initially cold and looked down on Kim Yushin and the Yonghwa Hyangdo. Deokman earns his respect during the war with Baekje, and then his loyalty later on. He is Yushin's war comrade and close friend. Along with Yushin, he is with Deokman until her final days.

Jung Ho-bin as Gukseon Munno 
The 8th leader of Hwarang warriors and the Gukseon. Along with Mishil, Seolwon, and Sadaham, they were the people who King Jinheung trusted the most during his era. He helps rescue young Princess Deokman from the palace to protect the royal house. He also took care of Bidam, per the request of King Jinji. He is later killed by Yeomjeong while compiling the Geographical Survey of the Three Kingdoms after Yeomjeong learns that he planned to give the books to Yushin.

Jo Min-ki as King Jinpyeong 
Baek Jong-min as young Jinpyeong
Kang San as child Jinpyeong
Deokman and Cheonmyeong's father. He was a weak king. He was placed on the throne after Mishil dethroned King Jinji.

Yoon Yoo-sun as Queen Maya 
Park Soo-jin as young Maya
King Jinpyeong's wife, mother of Deokman and Cheonmyeong. She is extremely devoted to her husband. In her early days, Mishil tried to murder Maya after Maya witnessed the Hwarang putting makeup on their faces. Mishil then tried to take Maya's place as queen, however, Munno saved Maya, and her twins, from falling to her death.

Seo Young-hee as Sohwa 
Maidservant to Jinpyeong and Maya, foster mother of Deokman. She brought Deokman to the desert and raised her there until Chilsuk found them. She "died" once in the desert trying to save Deokman. She dies a second time in an attempt to protect Deokman also.

Im Ye-jin as Lady Manmyeong 
Jinpyeong's older sister; Kim Yushin's mother, and Kim Seohyeon's wife. She had eloped with Kim Seohyeon in her younger days. Her princess status was not restored until the Queen Mother had forgiven her.

Jung Sung-mo as Kim Seo-hyun 
Manmyeong's husband; Kim Yushin's father. He is of Gaya descent and on the hwabaek council.

Park Jung-chul as Kim Yong-su 
King Jinji's eldest son; Princess Cheonmyeong's husband. He was originally named heir after Princess Cheonmyeong's three younger siblings die (because of the prophecy), and he goes out to war to prove himself. However, he is killed because of Mishil.

In Gyo-jin as Kim Yong-chun 
King Jinji's 2nd son, a government minister; Princess Cheonmyeong's ally and confidante. He was a pungwolju (prior to Hojae) and later served on the hwabaek council. He remains loyal to the royal house and becomes Deokman's ally later on.

Shin Goo as Eulje 
Senior government minister, friend to King Jinpyeong. He does everything he can to protect the royal house, even if it meant trying to kill Deokman. He is later stripped of his titles by King Jinpyeong.

Jung Woong-in as Misaeng 
Mishil's younger brother; the 10th leader of Hwarang warriors. He was also a father to over 100 children.

Dokgo Young-jae as Sejong 
Mishil's husband, the Prime Minister and 6th leader of Hwarang warriors

Jeon No-min as Seolwon 
Mishil's lover, the Minister of Defense and 7th leader of Hwarang warriors.

Kim Jung-hyun as Hajong 
Mishil and Sejong's son, a government minister and the 11th leader of Hwarang warriors

Baek Do-bin as Bojong 
Kwak Jung-wook as young Bojong
Mishil and Seolwon's son, a Hwarang commander

Song Ok-sook as Seori 
Chief mudang of Shilla, an old friend of Mishil and Misaeng

Ahn Gil-kang as Chilsook 
Formerly a Hwarang, agent of Mishil. He was given the task to find the lost twin. 15 years later, he found Deokman in the desert.

Lee Moon-sik as Jookbang 
A con artist who rips off the young Deokman and later joins Yu Shin's Hwarang

Ryu Dam as Godo 
A con artist who rips off the young Deokman and later joins Yu Shin's Hwarang)

Kang Sung-pil as Santak 
Seokpum's, and later Bidam's, aide-de-camp

Joo Sang-wook as Wolya 
Last prince of Gaya and the leader of the Bokya. He was adopted by Kim Seohyeon, and then replaced Yushin as Yonghwa Hyangdo's leader. Yushin earns Wolya's loyalty after letting the Gaya refugees stay on the Kim family's private land.

Jung Ho-keun as Seolji 
Kayan commander; he is loyal to Wolya.

Choi Won-young as General Gyebaek
Jun Young-bin as Gok Sa-heun
Jung Hyung-min as young Gok Sa-heun
Park Young-seo as Daepung
Lee Suk-min as young Daepung
Go Yoon-hoo as Hojae 
The 14th leader of Hwarang warriors (pungwolju), later a council member of the hwabaek.

Hong Kyung-in as Seokpum 
Noh Young-hak as young Seokpum
Commander of a Hwarang loyal to Misil. He comes from a poor family, but Misil gives him his elevated status--this is why he is so loyal to Misil.

Kang Ji-hoo as Imjong 
Kim Seok as young Imjong 
Commander of a Hwarang loyal to Kim Yong-choon

Seo Dong-won as Deokchung
Lee Do-hyun as young Deokchung
Jang Hee-woong as Bakui
Seo Sang-won as young Bakui
Lee Sang-hyun as Piltan
Kim Tae-jin  as young Piltan
Kim Dong-hee as Wangyoon
Choi Woo-sung as young Wangyoon
Ryu Sang-wook as Dae Nam-bo 
Kim Sang-bin as young Dae Nam-bo
The most prominent of Misaeng's sons, a Hwarang commander
Choi Sung-jo as Seonyeol
Oh Eun-suk as young Seonyeol
Kim Dong-soo as Hyeopseong
Moon Ji-yoon as Siyeol
Shin Tae-hoon as young Siyeol
Jung Hye-sun as Lady Man-ho 
Jinpyeong and Manmyeong's mother
Park Eun-bin as Boryang 
Bojong's daughter; Kim Chunchu's wife
Qri as Youngmo 
Hajong's daughter; Kim Yushin's wife
Mametkulovs Mansur as Katan 
Roman, possibly Jewish, trader who teaches Latin to the young Deokman
Seo Kang as Yangkil
O Yeong-su as Wolcheon abbot
 Mahbub Alam as Tibetan man (토번인)

Cameos
Lee Soon-jae as King Jinheung (ep 1)
Im Ho as King Jinji (ep 1)
Park Jae-jung as Sadaham (ep 13)
Mishil's first love

Ratings
 In the table below, the blue numbers represent the lowest ratings and the red numbers represent the highest ratings.

Filming location
It was filmed on location at MBC Dramia in Cheoin-gu, Yongin, Gyeonggi Province. Other historical dramas such as Dong Yi, Moon Embracing the Sun and Jumong were also filmed there.
It was filmed at the Shilla Millennium Park in Gyeongju.

Artistic license
The series adopted significant artistic license regarding the portrayal of historical events in order to accommodate the dramatic storyline. Notably, the reign of King Jinpyeong was compressed by over two decades such that in the series, Queen Seondeok was born within a year of his coronation (her actual date of birth is unknown). Accordingly, the preceding King Jinheung's reign was extended by a similar period, with him being depicted as an elderly man at his death. This allowed for Mishil and other prominent figures during Jinheung's reign to be involved in events concerning the Queen during her time as Royal Princess, even though there is no evidence to suggest what sort of interaction the two had if any. Artistic license was used to imagine her as being of a similar age to Kim Yushin and Bidam, though again, it is not clear historically if this was the case.  Another major change was in the date of her death: Bidam's execution and Kim Alcheon's appointment to his post were ordered by Jindeok of Silla, ten days after Queen Seondeok's death. Queen Jindeok is not mentioned in the series. More subtly, the real Seondeok likely never left Silla (stories concerning her childhood in the palace survive) and did not know Latin.

Plagiarism controversy
On 31 December 2009, Kim Ji-young, an obscure playwright and representative of Great Works Ltd., a culture content company, filed a plagiarism lawsuit against MBC and screenwriters Kim Young-hyun and Park Sang-yeon, saying they ripped off her script for Seondeok, Queen of Mugunghwa, an unperformed musical she said she wrote in 2005. Kim argued that the development of the story and conflict between characters were similar to her play, including discord between two major female characters, Seondeok and Mishil; a romance between Deokman and General Kim Yushin; and the story of the young Deokman wandering through a desert. The MBC drama contains all of these plot twists, which are not based on history but which Kim says she invented. Kim said she shared some of her scripts with the Korea Creative Content Agency to attract investment in the musical, and believed that's how the content was leaked. The injunction was turned down and Queen Seondeok ran from May to December 2009, but the copyright infringement case continued.

The MBC network and the series' writers maintained they did not know of the existence of Kim's play. MBC had copyrighted its script in May 2008. After Kim requested for an assessment by experts, the Seoul Southern District Court asked Seoul National University's Center for Law & Technology to investigate. In a process called a "script autopsy," the center first identifies similar content in the two scripts. At that point, university historians confirm historical facts regarding the characters and plot, and differentiates them from literary creations. Afterward, the center makes an appraisal based on copyright laws, then the court makes the final adjudication. In February 2011, the SNU Center for Law & Technology confirmed the plagiarism.

In December 2012, the High Court ruled in favor of plaintiff Kim Ji-young that Queen Seondeok was a work of plagiarism, and fined MBC . In its ruling, the court stated that though the characters and the details were in fact different, "the overall plot was the same" and it is "most probable that the network relied on the script and plot of the musical to produce their drama." Furthermore, any additional reruns on cable TV and internet, and the making of DVD and related books were banned.

Awards and nomination

Notes

References

External links
 The Great Queen Seondeok All Episodes Subtitled In English In HD
 Queen Seondeok official MBC website 
 The Great Queen Seondeok at MBC Global Media
 
 

MBC TV television dramas
2009 South Korean television series debuts
2009 South Korean television series endings
Korean-language television shows
Queen Seondeok of Silla
South Korean historical television series
Television series set in Silla
Television shows written by Kim Young-hyun
Television shows involved in plagiarism controversies